Honeymoon for Three is a 1935 British musical comedy film directed by Leo Mittler and starring Stanley Lupino, Aileen Marson and Jack Melford. It was made at Ealing Studios. The film's sets were designed by J. Elder Wills. It was the first film Lupino made after leaving British International Pictures and trying his luck as an independent producer.

When returning home drunk from a night out a young man (Lupino) accidentally finds himself in a woman's (Marson) flat where he passes out. Before he make his escape in the morning they are discovered by their parents and a passing policeman and forced to marry. They go through the ceremony but plan to go to California to get a divorce, and set off on their "honeymoon" along with her real fiancée (Melford). However during the journey she gradually begins to change her loathing of him.

Cast
 Stanley Lupino as Jack Denver  
 Aileen Marson as Yvonne Daumery 
 Jack Melford as Raymond Dirk  
 Robert English as Herbert Denver  
 Dennis Hoey as M. Daumery  
 Arty Ash as Herbert Jones  
 Roddy Hughes as Toomes  
 Syd Crossley as PC Smithers  
 Doris Rogers as Mme. Daumery  
 Barry Clifton as Crooner 
 Deidre Gale as The Child  
 Charles Penrose as Laughing passenger  
 Heron Carvic as Minor role  
 Percival Mackey as Bandleader

References

Bibliography
 Low, Rachael. Filmmaking in 1930s Britain. George Allen & Unwin, 1985.
 Wood, Linda. British Films, 1927-1939. British Film Institute, 1986.

External links

1935 films
British musical comedy films
1935 musical comedy films
Ealing Studios films
Films directed by Leo Mittler
Films set in London
Seafaring films
British black-and-white films
Films scored by Percival Mackey
1930s English-language films
1930s British films